La is a consonant of Indic abugidas. In modern Indic scripts, La is derived from the early "Ashoka" Brahmi letter  after having gone through the Gupta letter .

Āryabhaṭa numeration

Aryabhata used Devanagari letters for numbers, very similar to the Greek numerals, even after the invention of Indian numerals. The values of the different forms of ल are: 
ल  = 50 (५०)
लि  = 5,000 (५ ०००)
लु  = 500,000 (५ ०० ०००)
लृ  = 50,000,000 (५ ०० ०० ०००)
लॢ  = 5 (५×१०९)
ले  = 5 (५×१०११)
लै  = 5 (५×१०१३)
लो  = 5 (५×१०१५)
लौ  = 5 (५×१०१७)

Historic La
There are three different general early historic scripts - Brahmi and its variants, Kharoṣṭhī, and Tocharian, the so-called slanting Brahmi. La as found in standard Brahmi,  was a simple geometric shape, with variations toward more flowing forms by the Gupta . The Tocharian La  had an alternate Fremdzeichen form, . The third form of la, in Kharoshthi was probably derived from Aramaic separately from the Brahmi letter.

Brahmi La
The Brahmi letter , La, is probably derived from the Aramaic Lamed , and is thus related to the modern Latin L and Greek Lambda. Several identifiable styles of writing the Brahmi La can be found, most associated with a specific set of inscriptions from an artifact or diverse records from an historic period. As the earliest and most geometric style of Brahmi, the letters found on the Edicts of Ashoka and other records from around that time are normally the reference form for Brahmi letters, with vowel marks not attested until later forms of Brahmi back-formed to match the geometric writing style.

Tocharian La
The Tocharian letter  is derived from the Brahmi , and has an alternate Fremdzeichen form  used in conjuncts and as an alternate representation of Lä.

Kharoṣṭhī La
The Kharoṣṭhī letter  is generally accepted as being derived from the Aramaic Lamed , and is thus related to L and Lambda, in addition to the Brahmi La.

Devanagari La

La (ल) is a consonant of the Devanagari abugida. It ultimately arose from the Brahmi letter , after having gone through the Gupta letter . Letters that derive from it are the Gujarati letter લ, and the Modi letter 𑘩. The modern letterform for Devanagari La is slightly different than the historic form, with the vertical stem reaching to the lower baseline.

Devanagari Ḷa

Ḷa (ळ) is an additional Devanagari character originally used for an allophone of the voiced retroflex stop in Vedic Sanskrit, and current represents the lateral flap  that occurs in Marathi, Konkani, Garhwali, and Rajasthani.

Devanagari-using Languages
Like all Indic scripts, Devanagari uses vowel marks attached to the base consonant to override the inherent /ə/ vowel:

Conjuncts with ल and ळ

Devanagari exhibits conjunct ligatures, as is common in Indic scripts. In modern Devanagari texts, most conjuncts are formed by reducing the letter shape to fit tightly to the following letter, usually by dropping a character's vertical stem, sometimes referred to as a "half form". Some conjunct clusters are always represented by a true ligature, instead of a shape that can be broken into constituent independent letters. Vertically stacked conjuncts are ubiquitous in older texts, while only a few are still used routinely in modern Devanagari texts. The use of ligatures and vertical conjuncts may vary across languages using the Devanagari script, with Marathi in particular preferring the use of half forms where texts in other languages would show ligatures and vertical stacks.

Ligature conjuncts of ल and ळ
True ligatures are quite rare in Indic scripts. The most common ligated conjuncts in Devanagari are in the form of a slight mutation to fit in context or as a consistent variant form appended to the adjacent characters. Those variants include Na and the Repha and Rakar forms of Ra. Nepali and Marathi texts use the "eyelash" Ra half form  for an initial "R" instead of repha.
 Repha र্ (r) + ल (la) gives the ligature rla: 

 Eyelash र্ (r) + ल (la) gives the ligature rla:

 ल্ (l) + न (na) gives the ligature lna:

 ल্ (l) + rakar र (ra) gives the ligature lra:

 Repha र্ (r) + ळ (ḷa) gives the ligature rḷa:

 Eyelash र্ (r) + ळ (ḷa) gives the ligature rḷa:

Stacked conjuncts of ल
Vertically stacked ligatures are the most common conjunct forms found in Devanagari text. Although the constituent characters may need to be stretched and moved slightly in order to stack neatly, stacked conjuncts can be broken down into recognizable base letters, or a letter and an otherwise standard ligature.
 भ্ (bʰ) + ल (la) gives the ligature bʰla:

 ब্ (b) + ल (la) gives the ligature bla:

 छ্ (cʰ) + ल (la) gives the ligature cʰla:

 च্ (c) + ल (la) gives the ligature cla:

 ढ্ (ḍʱ) + ल (la) gives the ligature ḍʱla:

 ड্ (ḍ) + ल (la) gives the ligature ḍla:

 ध্ (dʱ) + ल (la) gives the ligature dʱla:

 द্ (d) + ल (la) gives the ligature dla:

 घ্ (ɡʱ) + ल (la) gives the ligature ɡʱla:

 ग্ (g) + ल (la) gives the ligature gla:

 ह্ (h) + ल (la) gives the ligature hla:

 झ্ (jʰ) + ल (la) gives the ligature jʰla:

 ज্ (j) + ल (la) gives the ligature jla:

 ख্ (kʰ) + ल (la) gives the ligature kʰla:

 क্ (k) + ल (la) gives the ligature kla:

 ल্ (l) + ब (ba) gives the ligature lba:

 ल্ (l) + च (ca) gives the ligature lca:

 ल্ (l) + ज (ja) gives the ligature lja:

 ल্ (l) + ज্ (j) + ञ (ña) gives the ligature ljña:

 ल্ (l) + ल (la) gives the ligature lla:

 ल্ (l) + ळ (ḷa) gives the ligature lḷa:

 ळ্ (ḷ) + ल (la) gives the ligature ḷla:

 ल্ (l) + ञ (ña) gives the ligature lña:

 ल্ (l) + व (va) gives the ligature lva:

 म্ (m) + ल (la) gives the ligature mla:

 ङ্ (ŋ) + ल (la) gives the ligature ŋla:

 न্ (n) + ल (la) gives the ligature nla:

 ण্ (ṇ) + ल (la) gives the ligature ṇla:

 ञ্ (ñ) + ल (la) gives the ligature ñla:

 फ্ (pʰ) + ल (la) gives the ligature pʰla:

 प্ (p) + ल (la) gives the ligature pla:

 श্ (ʃ) + ल (la) gives the ligature ʃla:

 स্ (s) + ल (la) gives the ligature sla:

 ष্ (ṣ) + ल (la) gives the ligature ṣla:

 थ্ (tʰ) + ल (la) gives the ligature tʰla:

 त্ (t) + ल (la) gives the ligature tla:

 ठ্ (ṭʰ) + ल (la) gives the ligature ṭʰla:

 ट্ (ṭ) + ल (la) gives the ligature ṭla:

 व্ (v) + ल (la) gives the ligature vla:

 य্ (y) + ल (la) gives the ligature yla:

 Note that the conjuncts shown here come from a typeface used for representing older Vedic texts, and use the older form of La for many conjuncts.

Bengali La
The Bengali script ল is derived from the Siddhaṃ , and is marked by a similar horizontal head line, but less geometric shape, than its Devanagari counterpart, ल. The inherent vowel of Bengali consonant letters is /ɔ/, so the bare letter ল will sometimes be transliterated as "lo" instead of "la". Adding okar, the "o" vowel mark, gives a reading of /lo/.
Like all Indic consonants, ল can be modified by marks to indicate another (or no) vowel than its inherent "a".

ল in Bengali-using languages
ল is used as a basic consonant character in all of the major Bengali script orthographies, including Bengali and Assamese.

Conjuncts with ল
Bengali ল exhibits conjunct ligatures, as is common in Indic scripts, with a tendency towards stacked ligatures.
 ব্ (b) + ল (la) gives the ligature bla:

 গ্ (g) + ল (la) gives the ligature gla:

 ক্ (k) + ল (la) gives the ligature kla:

 ল্ (l) + ভ (bʰa) gives the ligature lbʰa:

 ল্ (l) + ড (ḍa) gives the ligature lḍa:

 ল্ (l) + গ (ga) gives the ligature lga:

 ল্ (l) + ক (ka) gives the ligature lka:

 ল্ (l) + ক্ (k) + য (ya) gives the ligature lkya, with the ya phala suffix:

 ল্ (l) + ল (la) gives the ligature lla:

 ল্ (l) + ম (ma) gives the ligature lma:

 ল্ (l) + প (pa) gives the ligature lpa:

 ল্ (l) + ফ (pʰa) gives the ligature lpʰa:

 ল্ (l) + ট (ṭa) gives the ligature lṭa:

 ল্ (l) + ব (va) gives the ligature lva, with the va phala suffix:

 ল্ (l) + য (ya) gives the ligature lya, with the ya phala suffix:

 ম্ (m) + ল (la) gives the ligature mla:

 ফ্ (pʰ) + ল (la) gives the ligature pʰla:

 প্ (p) + ল (la) gives the ligature pla:

 র্ (r) + ল (la) gives the ligature rla, with the repha prefix:

 শ্ (ʃ) + ল (la) gives the ligature ʃla:

 স্ (s) + ল (la) gives the ligature sla:

 স্ (s) + প্ (p) + ল (la) gives the ligature spla:

Gujarati La

La (લ) is the twenty-eighth consonant of the Gujarati abugida. It is derived from the Devanagari La  with the top bar (shiro rekha) removed, and ultimately the Brahmi letter .

Gujarati-using Languages
The Gujarati script is used to write the Gujarati and Kutchi languages. Like all Indic scripts, Gujarati uses vowel marks attached to the base consonant to override the inherent /ə/ vowel:

Conjuncts with લ

Gujarati લ exhibits conjunct ligatures, much like its parent Devanagari Script. Most Gujarati conjuncts can only be formed by reducing the letter shape to fit tightly to the following letter, usually by dropping a character's vertical stem, sometimes referred to as a "half form". A few conjunct clusters can be represented by a true ligature, instead of a shape that can be broken into constituent independent letters, and vertically stacked conjuncts can also be found in Gujarati, although much less commonly than in Devanagari.
True ligatures are quite rare in Indic scripts. The most common ligated conjuncts in Gujarati are in the form of a slight mutation to fit in context or as a consistent variant form appended to the adjacent characters. Those variants include Na and the Repha and Rakar forms of Ra.
 ર્ (r) + લ (la) gives the ligature RLa:

 લ્ (l) + ર (ra) gives the ligature LRa:

 લ્ (l) + ન (na) gives the ligature LNa:

 શ્ (ʃ) + લ (la) gives the ligature ŚLa:

 હ્ (h) + લ (la) gives the ligature HLa:

Javanese La

Telugu La

La (ల) is a consonant of the Telugu abugida. It ultimately arose from the Brahmi letter . It is closely related to the Kannada letter ಲ. Since it lacks the v-shaped headstroke common to most Telugu letters, ల remains unaltered by most vowel matras, and its subjoined form is simply a smaller version of the normal letter shape.
Telugu conjuncts are created by reducing trailing letters to a subjoined form that appears below the initial consonant of the conjunct. Many subjoined forms are created by dropping their headline, with many extending the end of the stroke of the main letter body to form an extended tail reaching up to the right of the preceding consonant. This subjoining of trailing letters to create conjuncts is in contrast to the leading half forms of Devanagari and Bengali letters. Ligature conjuncts are not a feature in Telugu, with the only non-standard construction being an alternate subjoined form of Ṣa (borrowed from Kannada) in the KṢa conjunct.

Telugu Lla

In addition, Telugu has a second /l/ consonant Lla (ళ). It is closely related to the Kannada letter ಳ. Most Telugu consonants contain a v-shaped headstroke that is related to the horizontal headline found in other Indic scripts, although headstrokes do not connect adjacent letters in Telugu. The headstroke is normally lost when adding vowel matras.

Malayalam La

La (ല) is a consonant of the Malayalam abugida. It ultimately arose from the Brahmi letter , via the Grantha letter  La. Like in other Indic scripts, Malayalam consonants have the inherent vowel "a", and take one of several modifying vowel signs to represent syllables with another vowel or no vowel at all.

Conjuncts of ല 

As is common in Indic scripts, Malayalam joins letters together to form conjunct consonant clusters. There are several ways in which conjuncts are formed in Malayalam texts: using a post-base form of a trailing consonant placed under the initial consonant of a conjunct, a combined ligature of two or more consonants joined together, a conjoining form that appears as a combining mark on the rest of the conjunct, the use of an explicit candrakkala mark to suppress the inherent "a" vowel, or a special consonant form called a "chillu" letter, representing a bare consonant without the inherent "a" vowel. Texts written with the modern reformed Malayalam orthography, put̪iya lipi, may favor more regular conjunct forms than older texts in paḻaya lipi, due to changes undertaken in the 1970s by the Government of Kerala.
 ല് (l) + ക (ka) gives the ligature lka:

 ല് (l) + പ (pa) gives the ligature lpa:

 ല് (l) + ല (la) gives the ligature lla:

 ക് (k) + ഷ് (ṣ) + ല (la) gives the ligature kṣla:

Malayalam Ḷa

Ḷa (ള) is a consonant of the Malayalam abugida. Like in other Indic scripts, Malayalam consonants have the inherent vowel "a", and take one of several modifying vowel signs to represent syllables with another vowel or no vowel at all.

Conjuncts of ള

As is common in Indic scripts, Malayalam joins letters together to form conjunct consonant clusters. There are several ways in which conjuncts are formed in Malayalam texts: using a post-base form of a trailing consonant placed under the initial consonant of a conjunct, a combined ligature of two or more consonants joined together, a conjoining form that appears as a combining mark on the rest of the conjunct, the use of an explicit candrakkala mark to suppress the inherent "a" vowel, or a special consonant form called a "chillu" letter, representing a bare consonant without the inherent "a" vowel. Texts written with the modern reformed Malayalam orthography, put̪iya lipi, may favor more regular conjunct forms than older texts in paḻaya lipi, due to changes undertaken in the 1970s by the Government of Kerala.
 ള് (ḷ) + ള (ḷa) gives the ligature ḷḷa:

Malayalam Ḻa

Ḻa (ഴ) is a consonant of the Malayalam abugida. Like in other Indic scripts, Malayalam consonants have the inherent vowel "a", and take one of several modifying vowel signs to represent syllables with another vowel or no vowel at all.

Conjuncts of ഴ

As is common in Indic scripts, Malayalam joins letters together to form conjunct consonant clusters. There are several ways in which conjuncts are formed in Malayalam texts: using a post-base form of a trailing consonant placed under the initial consonant of a conjunct, a combined ligature of two or more consonants joined together, a conjoining form that appears as a combining mark on the rest of the conjunct, the use of an explicit candrakkala mark to suppress the inherent "a" vowel, or a special consonant form called a "chillu" letter, representing a bare consonant without the inherent "a" vowel. Texts written with the modern reformed Malayalam orthography, put̪iya lipi, may favor more regular conjunct forms than older texts in paḻaya lipi, due to changes undertaken in the 1970s by the Government of Kerala.
 ഴ് (ḻ) + ക (ka) gives the ligature ḻka:

Odia La

La (ଲ) is a consonant of the Odia abugida. It ultimately arose from the Brahmi letter , via the Siddhaṃ letter  La. Like in other Indic scripts, Odia consonants have the inherent vowel "a", and take one of several modifying vowel signs to represent syllables with another vowel or no vowel at all.

As is common in Indic scripts, Odia joins letters together to form conjunct consonant clusters. The most common conjunct formation is achieved by using a small subjoined form of trailing consonants. Most consonants' subjoined forms are identical to the full form, just reduced in size, although a few drop the curved headline or have a subjoined form not directly related to the full form of the consonant. The subjoined form of La is one of these mismatched forms, and is referred to as "La Phala". The second type of conjunct formation is through pure ligatures, where the constituent consonants are written together in a single graphic form. ଲ generates conjuncts only by subjoining and does not form ligatures.

Odia Ḷa

Odia also has a second La character, ଳ (Ḷa). It is descended from the Siddhaṃ letter  Ḷa. Like other Odia letters, ଳ has the inherent vowel "a", and takes one of several modifying vowel signs to represent syllables with another vowel or no vowel at all.

Like the letter ଲ, ଳ generates conjuncts only by subjoining and does not form ligatures.

Comparison of La
The various Indic scripts are generally related to each other through adaptation and borrowing, and as such the glyphs for cognate letters, including La, are related as well.  Where multiple characters are shown, the final character is Ḷa, except for Tocharian, New Tai Lue and Tai Viet.

Character encodings of La
Most Indic scripts are encoded in the Unicode Standard, and as such the letter La in those scripts can be represented in plain text with unique codepoint. La from several modern-use scripts can also be found in legacy encodings, such as ISCII.

References

 Conjuncts are identified by IAST transliteration, except aspirated consonants are indicated with a superscript "h" to distinguish from an unaspirated cononant + Ha, and the use of the IPA "ŋ" and "ʃ" instead of the less dinstinctive "ṅ" and "ś".

Indic letters